The Charles Taylor Master Mechanic Award is an honor presented by the United States Federal Aviation Administration  in honor of Charles Taylor, the first aviation mechanic in powered flight. The award recognizes the lifetime accomplishments of senior aviation mechanics. Taylor served as the Wright brothers' mechanic and is credited with designing and building the engine for their first successful aircraft.

To be eligible for the award, a person must:
Have 50 years in aviation maintenance as an accredited mechanic or repairman
Be an FAA-certificated mechanic or repairman for a minimum of 30 years

See also

 List of aviation awards
 Aircraft maintenance
 Aircraft Maintenance Technician

References

External links
Award Recipient List
Charles Taylor "Master Mechanic" Award, FAA Advisory Circular (AC) 25-62C (Dec. 20, 2004)

Aviation awards
Mechanics (trade)
Wright brothers